East Marton is a village in the Craven District of North Yorkshire, England. The Leeds and Liverpool Canal passes through the village on the descent from Foulridge to Leeds. The canal towpath in the village is part of the Pennine Way and the original pack-horse bridge over the canal was transformed into a double-arched bridge when the new A59 road was built on top of it. The canal was fully opened in 1816 with the section through East Marton being started in 1793. Some of the Navvies who died of smallpox whilst constructing the canal are buried in the churchyard.

The church, dedicated to St Peter, was first built during Norman times to replace an earlier Saxon church in the village. St Peter's has been added to in the 17th and 19th centuries.

There is a TV transmission mast just north of the village.

Together with West Marton it forms the civil parish of Martons Both and in the 2011 census the population was listed as 213.

East Marton was an ancient parish, sometimes known as Church Marton or Marton in Craven, in Staincliffe Wapentake in the West Riding of Yorkshire. It was transferred to North Yorkshire in 1974.

References

External links

Villages in North Yorkshire